Älvsjö is a borough (stadsdelsområde) in the southern part of Stockholm Sweden. The borough is divided into the districts Herrängen, Långsjö, Långbro, Älvsjö, Solberga, Örby Slott and Liseberg. It has about 21,000 inhabitants.

References

External links

Boroughs of Stockholm